2009 flu pandemic in Eurasia may refer to:
 2009-2010 flu pandemic in Asia
 2009-2010 flu pandemic in Europe